The Rosso di Ribia is a mountain of the Lepontine Alps, located in the canton of Ticino, Switzerland. with a height of 2,547 metres above sea level, it is the culminating point on the range between the Valle di Campo and Valle di Vergeletto. The Rosso di Ribia lies five kilometres east of Pizzo di Porcarese, where the border with Italy runs.

References

External links
 Rosso di Ribia on Hikr

Mountains of the Alps
Mountains of Switzerland
Mountains of Ticino
Lepontine Alps